Elections in Meghalaya are conducted since 1952 to elect the members for Meghalaya Legislative Assembly and Lok Sabha. There are 60 assembly constituencies and 2 Lok Sabha constituencies.

Vidhan Sabha elections

Lok Sabha elections 
The elections held in Meghalaya for Lok Sabha are listed below.

References